Fox 14 may refer to one of the following television stations in the United States, affiliated with the Fox Broadcasting Company:

Current
KARD in West Monroe, Louisiana
KCIT in Amarillo, Texas
KFJX in Pittsburg, Kansas / Joplin, Missouri
KFOX-TV in El Paso, Texas
KOCW in Hoisington / Great Bend, Kansas
Satellite of KSAS-TV in Wichita, Kansas
KSVT-LD in Twin Falls, Idaho
WYDO in Greenville, North Carolina

Former
KGSW (now KTFQ-DT) in Albuquerque, New Mexico (1986 to 1993)